F. L. "Ben" Waide (born May 17, 1963) is an American politician and a Republican member of the Kentucky House of Representatives representing District 10 from January 4, 2011, until January 2015.

Education
Waide earned his BS in health sciences from the University of Louisville.

Elections
2012: Waide was unopposed for the May 22, 2012 Republican primary and won the November 6, 2012 general election with 9,441 votes (60.4%) against Democratic nominee Mike Seiber.
2010: When District 10 Democratic Representative Eddie Ballard retired and left the seat open, Waide was unopposed for the May 18, 2010 Republican Primary and won the November 2, 2010 general election with 7,032 votes (56.4%) against Democratic nominee Michael Duncan.

Conviction
Representative Waide pleaded guilty to violations of campaign laws by using campaign funds for purposes other than his campaign. He was sentenced to 12 months' supervision.

References

External links
Official page at the Kentucky General Assembly

Ben Waide at Ballotpedia
FL (Ben) Waide at the National Institute on Money in State Politics

Place of birth missing (living people)
1963 births
Living people
Kentucky politicians convicted of crimes
Republican Party members of the Kentucky House of Representatives
People from Madisonville, Kentucky
University of Louisville alumni